Barbas is a Spanish surname. Notable people with the surname include:

 Carlos F. Barbas III (1964–2014), American chemist
 Coral Barbas, Spanish scientist
 Konstantinos Barbas (born 1983), Greek footballer
 Yoann Barbas (born 1988), French cyclist

Spanish-language surnames